Tolvaddon Downs is a hamlet in the parish of Illogan, Cornwall, England, United Kingdom.

References

Hamlets in Cornwall